Gordon Brand may refer to:

Gordon Brand Jnr (1958–2019), Scottish golfer
Gordon J. Brand (1955–2020), English golfer